Carlos Alberto Trullet (born 21 October 1949 in El Trébol, Santa Fe) is an Argentine football manager and former player.

Playing career
Trullet started his professional career in 1969 with Estudiantes de La Plata. In his two years with the club, he won two Copa Libertadores (1969, 1970) and one Copa Interamericana (1969).

In 1971, Trullet joined Colón de Santa Fe where he played until 1974. He had a brief spell with Atlético Regina in the Nacional championship of 1974 and then joined Unión de Santa Fe.

In 1978, he joined the Ecuadorian club team Emelec, where he remained until the end of his playing career.

Titles

Managerial career
After retiring from active play, Trullet served as the manager of several clubs in Argentina. Trullet managed Unión de Santa Fe over three separate periods (1990–1991, 1995–1997 and 2006–2007). In his second spell with the club, he coached them to a superlative record and helped them attain the successful promotion to the Argentine Primera in 1996.

Trullet has also served as the manager of Gimnasia y Esgima (CdU), Quilmes, Platense and Ben Hur. During his time as Ben Hur manager he helped the club to secure two promotions, from the regional leagues to the Primera B Nacional (second division).

Trullet also won with Atlético de Rafaela the 2010–11 season of the Primera B Nacional, achieving promotion to "Primera Division".

External links
 Managerial statistics in the Argentine Primera at Fútbol XXI  

1949 births
Living people
Footballers from Santa Fe, Argentina
Argentine footballers
Association football midfielders
Estudiantes de La Plata footballers
Club Atlético Colón footballers
Unión de Santa Fe footballers
C.S. Emelec footballers
Expatriate footballers in Ecuador
Argentine football managers
Unión de Santa Fe managers
Club Atlético Platense managers
Quilmes Atlético Club managers
Ferro Carril Oeste managers
Atlético de Rafaela managers
Club Atlético Patronato managers
Atlético Tucumán managers